Vendreshë is a former municipality in Berat County, central Albania. At the 2015 local government reform it became a subdivision of the municipality Skrapar. The population at the 2011 census was 984.

References

Former municipalities in Berat County
Administrative units of Skrapar
Populated places disestablished in 2015